Christopher "Buster" Mottram (born 25 April 1955 in Kingston upon Thames) is an English former tennis player and UK number 1 who achieved a career-high singles ranking of world No. 15 in February 1983.

Mottram represented Great Britain in the Davis Cup eight times, scoring 31 wins and 10 losses.

Early life
Mottram is the son of Tony Mottram and Joy Gannon, leading British tennis players in the 1950s.

His sister Linda Mottram is also a successful tennis player.

Career finals

Singles (2 titles, 5 runner-ups)

Doubles (5 titles, 6 runner-ups)

Politics 
While Mottram was still playing professionally, he became known for his right-wing views. He expressed support for the National Front, supported the policies of Enoch Powell, and applied unsuccessfully for the Conservative parliamentary candidacy in several constituencies. He subsequently formed a songwriting partnership with the black entertainer Kenny Lynch, writing the song "Average Man".

In November 2008, he was expelled from the UK Independence Party (UKIP) after attempting to broker an electoral pact with the British National Party. UKIP leader Nigel Farage called Mottram's offer "astonishing", declaring his party to be non-racist.

References

External links
 
 

1955 births
Living people
English male tennis players
People educated at King's College School, London
French Open junior champions
People from Kingston upon Thames
British male tennis players
Tennis people from Greater London
Grand Slam (tennis) champions in boys' singles